FC Hereti Lagodekhi is a Georgian football club based in Lagodekhi. They played in the Regional League, the fifth division in Georgian football.

Hereti Lagodekhi